Ravenshurst, or Ravenhurst, was a historic home located at Glen Arm, Baltimore County, Maryland, United States. It was a -story Carpenter Gothic-style board-and batten house built about 1854–1857. It was an addition to an earlier stone building thought to have been built about 1800. The home burned on October 31, 1985.

Ravenshurst was listed on the National Register of Historic Places in 1978.

References

External links
, including photo from 1977, at Maryland Historical Trust

Houses in Baltimore County, Maryland
Houses on the National Register of Historic Places in Maryland
Houses completed in 1857
Gothic Revival architecture in Maryland
National Register of Historic Places in Baltimore County, Maryland
1857 establishments in Maryland